"Tears Are Not Enough" is a 1985 charity single recorded by a supergroup of Canadian artists, under the name Northern Lights, to raise funds for relief of the 1983–85 famine in Ethiopia. It was one of a number of such supergroup singles recorded between December 1984 and April 1985, along with Band Aid's "Do They Know It's Christmas?" in the United Kingdom, USA for Africa's "We Are the World" in the United States, "Cantaré, cantarás" by a supergroup of Latin American and Spanish singers, Chanteurs sans Frontières's "Éthiopie" in France, and Fondation Québec-Afrique's "Les Yeux de la faim" in Quebec.

Although recorded independently of the USA for Africa project, it was included on the full-length We Are the World album.

The project was organized by Bruce Allen, who brought together a large group of artists to record a song written by David Foster, Jim Vallance, Bryan Adams, Rachel Paiement, Paul Hyde and Bob Rock. Foster and Vallance wrote the music and initial lyrics, Adams completed the English lyrics, Paiement wrote the one French verse, Rock & Hyde contributed the song title. The song was recorded on February 10, 1985 at Manta Sound studios in Toronto.

The song was issued as the album's second and final single by Columbia Records on May 1, 1985, and quickly reached number one on the Canadian Top 40 chart.  It also finished number one on the year-end Canadian charts for that year. The song's video also received extensive airplay on MuchMusic.

The vocals were recorded at Manta Sound Studios in downtown Toronto on Sunday, February 10, 1985. Gordon Lightfoot drove himself to the recording in a pick-up truck. Neil Young and Joni Mitchell arrived together in a taxi. Mark Holmes of Platinum Blonde arrived in a white stretch limousine.

On December 22, 1985, CBC Television aired a 90-minute documentary by John Zaritsky on the song and its creation. A CBC reporter, Brian Stewart, had been the first Western journalist to bring the famine in Ethiopia to worldwide attention. The film was a shortlisted Genie Award finalist for Best Documentary Film at the 7th Genie Awards in 1986.

By 1990, the project had raised $3.2 million for famine relief projects in Africa. Ten percent of the funds raised was set aside to assist Canadian food banks.

Performers

Solo vocalists (in order)

Heard in duos or trios
Mike Reno (Loverboy) with Liberty Silver
Carroll Baker, Ronnie Hawkins and Murray McLauchlan
Véronique Béliveau, Robert Charlebois and Claude Dubois (in French)
Bryan Adams with Donny Gerrard (Skylark)
Alfie Zappacosta with Lisa Dal Bello
Carole Pope (Rough Trade) and Paul Hyde (The Payola$)
Salome Bey, Mark Holmes (Platinum Blonde) and Lorraine Segato (The Parachute Club)

Chorus members

Chorus members included:

Instrumentation and production

David Foster - Keyboards, Producer
Jim Vallance - Drums, Engineer, Associate Producer
Paul Dean (Loverboy) - Guitar
Steven Denroche - French Horn
Doug Johnson (Loverboy) - Synthesizer
David Sinclair (Straight Lines / Body Electric - Acoustic guitar
Hayward Parrott - Engineer
Geoff Turner - Engineer
Bob Rock (The Payola$) - Engineer
Humberto Gatica - Mixing Engineer

Recording process
Joni Mitchell later spoke to writer Iain Blair about the recording experience: "I know it sounds ridiculous, but I was literally starving when we did the session 'cause my yoga teacher had sent me to a psychic dietician who, while rubbing her chin and swinging her arm around in a circle, had diagnosed a lot of food allergies. The result was, predictably, that I was hardly allowed to eat anything, so by the time I arrived with an apple and a rice patty, my poor stomach was making all these strange noises. Then we get in the studio, and the engineer says he can't record 'cause he's picking up some weird rumbling sound coming from my direction. (She laughed.) And it was all pretty ironic, considering the subject matter!"

At one point during the recording process, Foster also had Neil Young re-record his line after singing the word "innocence" flat, to which Young famously quipped, "That's my sound, man."

According to journalist Terry David Mulligan, singer/songwriter Buffy Sainte-Marie was supposed to be part of the project but did not show up to recording sessions. As a result, the term "Buffy bailed" became an expression in certain Canadian music circles.

Video

The song's video opens with footage from Brian Stewart's original CBC News report on the famine, and then cuts to the performers singing the song in a studio. Near the end of the video, footage also appears from the 1985 NHL All-Star Game in Calgary, depicting the Campbell Conference All-Stars — including Wayne Gretzky, Grant Fuhr, Jari Kurri and Miroslav Frycer — singing along as the audience waves flags and banners in the air.

2022 live version

A live version of "Tears Are Not Enough" was performed at the Canadian Songwriters Hall of Fame gala in Toronto on September 24, 2022. The rendition included many original Northern Lights members including soloists Adams, Hart, Hill and Cockburn plus new Canadian talent such as Alessia Cara and Charlotte Cardin.

References

External links
 Interview with Songwriter Jim Vallance on "Tears Are Not Enough"
 Many photos of the performers as well as the song lyrics
 Tears Are Not Enough deep dive on Toronto Mike'd

1985 singles
Song recordings produced by David Foster
Songs written by David Foster
Songs written by Jim Vallance
Songs written by Bryan Adams
1985 songs
1980s ballads
Aid songs for Africa
Anne Murray songs
Bryan Adams songs
RPM Top Singles number-one singles
Pop ballads
Gospel songs
All-star recordings
Charity singles
Canadian pop songs
Columbia Records singles
Songs written by Bob Rock
Canadian documentary films
1986 films
1980s Canadian films